The One Hundred Thirteenth Ohio General Assembly was the legislative body of the state of Ohio in the years 1979 and 1980. In this General Assembly, both the Ohio Senate and the Ohio House of Representatives were controlled by the Democratic Party.  In the Senate, there were 18 Democrats and 15 Republicans. In the House, there were 66 Democrats and 33 Republicans.

Major Events

Vacancies
January 1, 1979: Senator Tony Hall (D-6th) resigns to take a seat in the United States House of Representatives.
March 30, 1979: Senator Bill Mussey (R-14th) resigns.
June 26, 1979: Senator Walter White (R-12th) resigns.
July 17, 1979: Senator Ferald Ritchie (R-12th) resigns.
March 6, 1980: Representative Bill O'Neil (R-28th) resigns.
April 24, 1979: Representative Irma Karmol (R-44th) dies in a car accident
April 22, 1980: Representative Phale Hale (D-31st) resigns.

Appointments
January 9, 1979: Chuck Curran is appointed to the 6th Senatorial District due to the resignation of Tony Hall.
April 3, 1979: Cooper Snyder is appointed to the 14th Senatorial District due to the resignation of Bill Mussey.
June 29, 1979: Ferald Ritchie is appointed to the 12th Senatorial District due to the resignation of Walter White.
July 17, 1979: Richard Ditto is appointed to the 12th Senatorial District due to the resignation of Ferald Ritchie.
May 15, 1979: David Karmol is appointed to the 44th House District due to the death of Irma Karmol.
March 11, 1980: Dana Deshler is appointed to the 28th House District due to the resignation of Bill O'Neil.
April 22, 1980: Otto Beatty Jr. is appointed to the 31st House District due to the resignation of Phale Hale.

Senate

Leadership

Majority leadership
 President of the Senate: Oliver Ocasek
 President pro tempore of the Senate: Morris Jackson
 Assistant pro tempore: Harry Meshel

Minority leadership
 Leader: Paul Gillmor
 Assistant Leader: Tom Van Meter
 Whip: Stanley Aronoff

Members of the 113th Ohio Senate

House of Representatives

Leadership

Majority leadership
 Speaker of the House: Vern Riffe
 President pro tempore of the Senate: Barney Quilter
 Floor Leader: Bill Mallory
 Assistant Majority Floor Leader: Vernon Cook
 Majority Whip: Francine Panehal

Minority leadership
 Leader: Corwin Nixon
 Assistant Leader: William G. Batchelder
 Whip: Donna Pope

Members of the 113th Ohio House of Representatives

Appt.- Member was appointed to current House Seat

See also
Ohio House of Representatives membership, 126th General Assembly
Ohio House of Representatives membership, 125th General Assembly
 List of Ohio state legislatures

References

Ohio House of Representatives official website
Project Vote Smart – State House of Ohio
Map of Ohio House Districts
Ohio District Maps 2002–2012
2006 election results from Ohio Secretary of State

Ohio legislative sessions
Ohio
Ohio
1979 in Ohio
1980 in Ohio
de:Repräsentantenhaus von Ohio